Idol: The Coup is a South Korean television series directed by No Jong-chan and starring an ensemble cast featuring Ahn Hee-yeon, Ahn Sol-bin, Han So-eun, Chu So-jung, Kim Ji-won, Kwak Si-yang and Kim Min-kyu. Written by Jung Yoon-jung, it tells the story of a "failed" K-pop idol girl group who need just one shot at success for them to disband.

The series aired on JTBC from November 8 to December 14, 2021 on Mondays and Tuesdays at 23:00 KST. The series is also available simultaneously with Korea on iQIYI for streaming worldwide.

Synopsis 
After losing support from their parent company Starpeace Entertainment, the members of the K-pop idol girl group Cotton Candy—Jenna, Hyun-ji, Stella, El and Chae-ah—face the inescapable prospect of disbanding. The company has neglected them while a follow-up boy group Mars has taken centerstage and became top idols. Cotton Candy's six years of trying to make a comeback seemed futile as they suffer heavily from the harshness of the entertainment industry and the contempt of the general public who tag them as "failed idols" (mangdol). Eventually, Cotton Candy resolves to fight against the people and forces that try to drag them down, striving with all their might for even just one shot at success: they aim to win the No. 1 spot in a music show before disbanding for good.

Cast

Main 
 Ahn Hee-yeon as Kim Je-na (Jenna)
 the leader and a sub-vocalist of the struggling K-pop girl group Cotton Candy under Starpeace Entertainment. Jenna is a multitalented composer and producer who makes songs for their team. She bears the burden of keeping their team together, aiming towards their success, despite being neglected by Starpeace and the dilemmas that hamper their path towards success. She is a persevering and fearless artist, though she is also prone to wavering in her stand when faced by difficult problems.
 Ahn Sol-bin as Oh Hyun-ji
 the youngest member, main dancer and a rapper of the struggling K-pop girl group Cotton Candy under Starpeace Entertainment. As a talented dancer and choreographer, Hyun-ji is in charge of working out their team's dance moves. She appears to be a troublemaker inclined to anger, but she is actually loving of the people around her and dreams to make her sickly grandmother proud of her. She speaks in a strong Gyeongsang dialect when talking to her grandmother and the people from her hometown.
 Han So-eun as Jang Stella
 the eldest member and a sub-vocalist of the struggling K-pop girl group Cotton Candy under Starpeace Entertainment. Stella is a pure-hearted girl who believes in Jenna's leadership of the group. She is battling with anxiety issues triggered by her dark past which she fears might drag their team down.
 Chu So-jung as Kang Yu-ri (El)
 the main vocalist of the struggling K-pop girl group Cotton Candy under Starpeace Entertainment. El became a member of Cotton Candy after leaving her previous girl group KillA. She has a cold, realistic personality that can sometimes make her look selfish. Due to Cotton Candy's failure and imminent disbanding, she gained a strong desire to pursue a solo career.
 Kim Ji-won as Park Chae-ah
 the lead dancer and a sub-vocalist of the struggling K-pop girl group Cotton Candy under Starpeace Entertainment. Chae-ah hails from a rich family but is not supported by her mother. She does not feel confident of her skills, and this pushes her to practice hard for their team's performances.
 Kwak Si-yang as Cha Jae-hyuk
 the CEO of Starpeace Entertainment; Seo Ji-han's half-brother and CEO Ma Jin-woo's successor. CEO Cha became the head of Starpeace Entertainment after the death of its former CEO and founder Ma Jin-woo. He is a cold-hearted entrepreneur who treats the company's artists as commodities, especially Cotton Candy. His judgement and authority soon gets challenged when Jenna and her co-members in Cotton Candy go against his will.
 Kim Min-kyu as Seo Ji-han
 the leader and main vocalist the popular K-pop boy group Mars under Starpeace Entertainment; CEO Cha Jae-hyuk's half-brother. Ji-han, a skilled music producer, yearns to become an artist that is beyond singing, dancing and popularity, and he ponders on what should truly define him as an artist. Defiant of CEO Cha's harsh treatment of artists, he sees himself in the struggles of his senior labelmate Cotton Candy.

Supporting

People around Cotton Candy
 Kang Jae-joon as Jin Doo-ho
 An employee of Starpeace Entertainment; Cotton Candy's former manager. Doo-ho is a very supportive manager to Cotton Candy; he continues to care for the group even when the company neglected them. He is later killed in a vehicular accident on the same day as his boss Ma Jin-woo's death.
 Kim Ji-in as Choi So-yeon
 The leader of the K-pop girl group KillA; she is in conflict with Cotton Candy member El.
 Park Si-hyun as Ae-rin
 Hyun-ji's friend.

Mars
 Jo Joon-young as Han Seon-woo (Ray)
 a vocalist and rapper of the popular K-pop boy group Mars under Starpeace Entertainment. A talented and workaholic artist, Ray is worried about Ji-han's involvement with Cotton Candy, thinking it may affect their own team.
 Baek Seo-hoo as Park Tae-young
 a sub-vocalist and rapper of the popular K-pop boy group Mars under Starpeace Entertainment.
 Hong Eun-ki as Kim Yul
 a main dancer and a vocalist of the popular K-pop boy group Mars under Starpeace Entertainment.
 Lee Eun-sang as Park Eun-dan (Dan)
 a main dancer, sub-vocalist and rapper of the popular K-pop boy group Mars under Starpeace Entertainment.

Starpeace Entertainment
 Jung Woong-in as Ma Jin-woo.
 the founder and former CEO of Starpeace Entertainment; CEO Cha Jae-hyuk's predecessor. CEO Ma organized Cotton Candy, the company's pioneering idol group, and was once doting and supportive of them. He began neglecting Cotton Candy when the group started losing popularity and the company's follow-up boy group Mars became much more successful. After six years of  persistent pleading from Cotton Candy and Doo-ho, he decides to readopt the group but is cut short by his untimely death on the same day as Doo-ho's vehicular accident.
 Lee You-jin as Bong Chung-bong (Bbiyong)
 a genius music producer working under Starpeace Entertainment.
 Ahn Se-ha as Yoon Se-yeol
 the general manager of Starpeace Entertainment.

Others 
 Cha Sun-woo as Troy
 one of the industry's leading music producers who sweep the awards ceremony and a competitor to Bbiyong.
Son Byong-ho as Kim Ho-yong
 a film director who is involved in Stella's dark past.
Shin Jae-hoon as Mo Ga-jin
 a journalist under the Entertainment Department of the news agency Issue&24. Ga-jin is persistent in sticking his nose in the entertainment industry and is notorious in writing exposés about celebrities.
 Yoon Bok-in as Dr. Cha Mi-yeon
 CEO Cha Jae-hyuk's aunt and the director of a clinic specializing in oriental medicine.
Oh Yoon-hong as Jang Stella's mother

Special appearances 

Kim Byung-chun as manager of the management department (Ep. 2)
Jang Sung-kyu as radio DJ (Ep.1)
Big Naughty as himself (Ep.1)
Narsha as music talk show MC (Ep.1)
Raiden as himself (Ep.1)
Lia Kim as herself (Ep.10)
Oh Jeong-yeon as Interview MC (Ep.11)
Eunseo as Music Tank MC (Ep.12)
Kang Min-hee as Music Tank MC (Ep.12)
Son Sook as Hyun-ji's grandma (Ep.12)

Episodes 
The following table contains the episodes of the series:

Production 
It is a joint Korean-American drama in which Take-Two Media Group and JTBC Studios collaborated with the American company Transparent Arts, to which Tiffany Hwang belongs.

Ratings

References

External links 
  
  Idol: The Coup at Naver 
 Idol: The Coup at Daum 
 
 

South Korean musical television series
Television series by JTBC Studios
JTBC television dramas
Korean-language television shows
2021 South Korean television series debuts
2021 South Korean television series endings